Conkies is a sweet cornmeal-based food item popular in the West Indies. The essential ingredients include cornmeal, coconut, sweet potato, raisins and pumpkin and the mixture is cooked by steaming in banana leaves.

In Barbados, conkies were once associated with the old British colonial celebration of Guy Fawkes Day on November 5.  In modern Barbados they are eaten during Independence Day celebrations on November 30.

In Saint Lucia and Trinidad and Tobago it is called paime and is usually associated with Creole Day (Jounen Kwéyòl), which is on the last Sunday of October every year in Saint Lucia.

See also

 Corn cookie
 List of maize dishes
 Pasteles
 Tamale

References

 "Time for Conkies." Antigua Sun, 30 Nov 2007.
 Tastes Like Home: Time for Conkies.

Notes

External links

Caribbean cuisine
Barbadian cuisine
Maize dishes